Benny Dembitzer is a British economist who has specialized in international economic development issues and consequences of climate change, in particular in the economies of sub-Saharan Africa. He is Visiting Professor of Global Economics at the China Centre of University College, London and a Rockefeller Fellow. He has worked for a variety of NGOs and United Nations agencies. His work has taken him to 35 different countries in sub-Saharan Africa, as well as Indonesia, Pakistan, Chile and Brazil. He was director of the European Office of International Physicians for the Prevention of Nuclear War, when the organization was awarded the 1985 Nobel Peace Prize.

Education and Research 
Dembitzer graduated from Trinity College, Cambridge University with a BA in economics in 1962, followed by MA in 1965.  He studied under Amartya Sen, winner of the 1998 Nobel Prize for Economics for his life-long study of famines across the world. He followed Sen for a brief time as a supervisor in economics at Trinity College. He also studied under Gunnar Myrdal at Uppsala University in 1962 and in 1979 at the IMD Management school linked to the University of Lausanne, where he obtained a postgraduate degree in management studies. He returned to Cambridge in 1964 and was Assistant Registrar of the University, where he remained until 1968.

He subsequently was on the staff of the Economist Intelligence Unit (part of the Economist newspaper) in London for three and a half years, from 1970 to 1973. After some years of international work as a consultant in development economics, he returned to teaching at British universities. Since 1992 he has been Visiting Lecturer in economics at various times at Cranfield, London SouthBank, London Metropolitan, and Greenwich Universities. He is a visiting scholar of the University of Greenwich and Honorary fellow of UNISUL University in Florianopolis (State of Santa Catarina, Brazil), which awarded him an Honorary Doctorate in 2019.

Work for international organizations and NGOs 
Over the years he has worked in 35 countries in Africa and 2 in Asia. In 1980-81 he was United Nations Development Programme (UNDP) Adviser to the Handicrafts and Small Scale Industries Development Agency (HASIDA), based in Addis Ababa, Ethiopia with the responsibility of directing the work of 42 different projects across the country. At the Commonwealth Secretariat he was for two years (1981–83) adviser on industrial development to the (then) nine Southern Africa Development Coordination Conference (SADCC) Countries. He travelled frequently to that part of the world.

He has worked for different United Nations agencies – UNDP, International Labour Organization (ILO), United Nations Industrial Development Organization (UNIDO), United Nations Capital Development Fund (UNCDF), International Trade Centre (ITC), World Bank, the British Government’s Department for International Development (DFID), and the Dutch Ministry for International Aid in various parts of the world. He worked for the Aga Khan in Pakistan; for the UNIDO in Ethiopia; in Lesotho for the ITC; Djibouti for the World Bank; Guinea and Indonesia for the UNDP. He also drafted the UNDP five-year economic development plans for both The Gambia and Liberia. For seven years he was economic adviser to the Dutch aid programme in Indonesia. He worked as a consultant for DFID on Fairtrade. In 2003 he worked with UNAIDS in London and Addis Ababa.

Simultaneously, he has worked for various voluntary agencies, including OXFAM in Ethiopia; CARE International in Lesotho; International Voluntary Service in Botswana, Cameroon, Lesotho and Swaziland; War on Want in Cameroon. In the early 1970s he undertook undercover missions for Amnesty International in Gabon, Cameroon and Chad. In 1973 he set up PROJECT HAND, considered the first FairTrade organisation in Britain. He directed the work of the Fund for Research and Investment for the Development of Africa (FRIDA) in twenty African countries from 1975 to 1979. He was European Director of International Physicians for the Prevention of Nuclear War (IPPNW) when it was awarded the Nobel Peace Prize in 1985. That year he became marginally involved with the relief operations kick-started by Bob Geldof in Ethiopia after the Live Aid global concert. In 2004 he organized a conference in Cambridge on corruption in the arms trade for Transparency International, UK. From 1987 to 2006 he ran the annual Global Partnership, an event bringing together some hundreds of British voluntary agencies working in development. During 2007 and 2008 he was economic adviser to Africa Invest, a fund investing in agriculture in Malawi.

In recent years he has been invited to address international conferences and give keynote speeches at various institutions, among others: Encuentros por Chile, the International Association of Chilean scholars (2006), PricewaterhouseCoopers's international development meeting in Washington D.C (2001), the Parliament of the State of Santa Catarina in Brazil (2015), and Cheltenham Ladies' College (2016).

Book Publications on International Development and Climate Change

The Attack on World Poverty: Going Back to Basics. 2009. Green Print. 
"A really important, engaging and stimulating book" Maggie Brown, Media Editor, The Guardian

"A masterful synthesis of the current issues of world poverty and development, a blistering indictment of our failure to get to grips with them, and an incisive exploration of what can be done to begin to bring about real change" Monica Ali, author and broadcaster

Sleepwalking into Global Famine. 2012. Ethical Events. 
"Take time to read this book, or it will be too late". Professor Lord Desai, Deputy Leader of the House of Lords, former professor of Development Economics, London School of Economics

"This is a vital topic and Benny Dembitzer confronts the challenges with clarity and passion and real understanding of what is at stake for all our futures". Jonathan Dimbleby, broadcaster and author

"Eloquently expounds the interconnected problems stemming from the pressures imposed by a growing and more demanding human population on the world's resources. It is crucial that these issues should be tackled, and that the huge inequities between the developing and the developed world should be reduced in the process. And that's why the book is so timely and welcome”. Lord Rees, OM, Former Master of Trinity College, Past President of the Royal Astronomical Society

The Famine Next Door: Africa Is Burning, the North Is Watching. 2019. Ethical Events 
"His analysis is spot on". Calestous Juma, Professor of the Practice of International Development, Harvard University

"The book brings out clearly the reactions that occur when the living conditions of a country become unbearable to its citizens and the consequences that follow. The book is a classic reminder to all of us that ... the storm, predicted for 2030 is happening far earlier than had been anticipated. The key message from the book is that unless bold and unusual steps are taken, more of the world is heading for a perfect storm.” Professor William G. Otim-Nape, Director of the African Innovations Institute, Kampala, Uganda

"[The book shows that] genuine human solidarity can no longer be seen as an option. It is an imperative. Prevailing systems have failed." Frank Judd, former Minister for Overseas Development Assistance, former Director of Oxfam

Views on economics 
Dembitzer argues that most economic teaching in the UK has become an appendix of mathematics teaching. This situation has arisen because every young person (men more than women) is desperate to join the financial world and be paid enormous salaries. This situation is compounded by an inevitable self-generated bias in private schools; more parents who have made their money in the financial sector are keen for their children to be taught economics as a financial tool. Whilst some teachers still remember that there are different economic systems - classical economics, the neo-liberal economics, the Marxist model, the Keynesian model, even those who teach development economics forget that economics is a social science. It is essentially shaped by the communities and people who use it. Dembitzer argues that issues such as economic markets are fundamentally shaped by social issues. Laws and social and cultural mores make it impossible for markets ever to be the perfect system that the financial world assumes. There is, for example, no market for handguns in the UK, but there is one in the USA. Trade in slaves is outlawed everywhere but widely practiced in Libya. There is no market for alcohol in the Moslem world (unless you are well connected). In most poor countries, work is highly regulated by social norms; only men can perform certain chores and women some others. Women can collect the coffee beans, but only men can trade them. Within such societal diktats, the market remains a theoretical device.

Approach to international development and climate change 
Dembitzer has published three books on issues of international development (see Publications). In The Attack on World Poverty: Going Back to Basics he has fundamentally disagreed with the views of most economists that claim that Africa can be developed through either aid (as argued by Jeffrey Sachs at Columbia University) or by policy interventions from the top, as argued by World Bank economists such as Sir Paul Collier at Oxford University. He is a keen supporter of the thinking and writings of Elinor Ostrom and Frances Moore Lappe, both American social scientists who argue that local people are the best judges of what is the solutions to their challenges.

He argues that any outside intervention, dictated by policies in which local people have not been deeply involved, is bound to fail. More fundamentally he would argue that the only future for sub-Saharan countries lies in agriculture. He feels that the plethora of NGOs is not helping. The large international NGOs are following a Western expansionist policy that mirrors the geo-political priorities of their governments, from which they receive huge sums to implement policies dictated by governments and not questioned by the same NGOs. The small NGOs are too often caught in such cut-throat rivalry with one another that individually they can achieve very little. He would argue that the more than 900 UK-based NGOs working in Malawi in 2021 or the 2300 in Kenya, do not act for the benefit of the local people because they are all driven, fundamentally, by non-local priorities.

He has recently argued that international aid and local development are two contradictory forces, in the sense that unless development is undertaken or encouraged by national governments, the role of outsiders can only be palliative. External agents cannot provoke something that is genuinely local, owned by locals and therefore rooted in the local ground.

His newest book, The Famine Next Door, claims that the push factor forcing people to escape is greater than the pull of Europe. “People [in Africa] cannot survive in their own countries. Population growth is exponential. Climate change has dried their lands. Cities have become huge slums. There is no food. There is no water. They have to escape to survive. If we look at the issues solely from the fear of being ‘swamped by aliens’, the fear factor being used by the increasingly right-of-centre governments in Europe and the US, we are unable to face up to reality. The solution is to help prevent the mass migration at its roots.”

References

British economists
Living people
Year of birth missing (living people)
Alumni of the University of Cambridge
Academics of the University of Cambridge